Dayton Independent School District is a public school district based in Dayton, Texas (USA).

The district serves the cities of Dayton, Dayton Lakes, Kenefick, and some unincorporated areas including Eastgate, Stilson, and the northern half of Old River-Winfree. A very small portion of the district lies in neighboring Harris County. The district stretches 263 miles square, one of the largest school districts by area in the Houston-The Woodlands-Sugarland, TX Metropolitan Area.

In 2009, the school district was rated "academically unacceptable" by the Texas Education Agency. In 2022, it received a "C" rating with a composite score of 72. It went unrated in two of the categories ratable by the TEA due to its low scores in academic growth and closing the gaps in student performance. 

Former Dayton ISD trustee John Otto held the District 18 seat in the Texas House of Representatives from 2005 - 2016, which encompasses Liberty, San Jacinto, and Walker counties.

High schools

Dayton High School (Grades 9-12)

Intermediate Schools

Woodrow Wilson Junior High (Grades 6-8)

Elementary schools
Each of the current K-5 schools used to handle different grade levels, but after the Dayton ISD Board of Trustees passed a bond in 2014, it began construction of new campuses and the repurposing of former campuses. It should be noted Colbert Elementary is not a new campus nor has it undergone any construction. Construction on new campuses was completed and the distribution of grade levels and areas of residence was changed to the following:

Grades K-5 

Kimmie M. Brown Elementary
Dr. E.R. Richter Elementary
Stephen F. Austin Elementary

Pre-Kindergarten 

Colbert Elementary

Alternative Education Center 
While Dayton ISD formerly offered education for 6th graders at Nottingham Middle School. Since the 2014 bond approval, Nottingham Middle School was repurposed to fulfill state requirements of having a DAEP/AAEP Alternate Education Center.

Woodrow Wilson Junior High now educates 6th-graders and the Nottingham campus has become the Alternative Education Center. Dayton ISD offers a night school program and education for children with disciplinary problems or a variety of other issues which may require a different style of learning environment from the district's other schools.

References

External links
Dayton ISD

School districts in Liberty County, Texas
School districts in Harris County, Texas